The Permians or Perm Finns are the peoples who speak Permic languages, in the Uralic language family, and include Komis and Udmurts. Formerly the name Bjarmians was also used to describe these peoples. Recent research on the Finno-Ugric substrate in northern Russian dialects suggests that in Bjarmaland there once lived speakers of other Finno-Ugric languages beside the Permians.

The ancestors of the Permians originally inhabited the land called Permia covering the middle and upper Kama River. Permians split into two groups, probably during the 9th century.

The Komis came under the rule of the Novgorod Republic in the 13th century and were converted to Orthodox Christianity in the 1360-1370s. In 1471-1478, their lands were conquered by the Grand Duchy of Moscow that later became the Tsardom of Russia. In the 18th century the Russian authorities opened the southern parts of the land to colonization and the northern parts became a place to which criminal and political prisoners were exiled.

The Udmurts came under the rule of the Tatars, the Golden Horde and the Khanate of Kazan until their land was ceded to Russia, and the people were Christianized at the beginning of the 18th century.

See also
 Bjarmaland
 Chud
 Great Perm

References

 
Finnic peoples